XHUSH-FM is a radio station in Hermosillo, Sonora. It is owned by the Universidad de Sonora and broadcasts from its campus, with three repeaters in Caborca, Navojoa and Santa Ana.

History
XEUS-AM 850 signed on October 8, 1962, as the first broadcasting station of the Universidad de Sonora. It was joined in 1963 by XEUDS on shortwave and in 1965 by a TV station, XHUS-TV channel 8.

In 2002, Radio Universidad expanded into a statewide network with the inauguration of four FM radio stations, including the new XHUSH-FM 107.5 in Hermosillo. The AM station was later discontinued, as was the shortwave service.

Satellite stations
XHUSH has several satellite stations:

References

Spanish-language radio stations
Radio stations in Sonora
University radio stations in Mexico
Mass media in Hermosillo
Radio stations established in 1962